Miranpur is a town and a nagar panchayat in Muzaffarnagar district in the Indian state of Uttar Pradesh.

Demographics
 India census, Miranpur had a population of 26,101. Males constitute 53% of the population and females 47%. Miranpur has an average literacy rate of 53%, lower than the national average of 59.5%: male literacy is 61%, and female literacy is 45%. In Miranpur, 19% of the population is under 6 years of age.

People from Miranpur
 Vishnu Prabhakar (21 June 1912 – 11 April 2009), Hindi writer
 A. M. Turaz, Indian poet, lyricist, and script writer
 Sachin Sangal

References

Cities and towns in Muzaffarnagar district